Ranz Kyle Viniel Evidente Ongsee (born May 6, 1997), better known as Ranz Kyle, is a Filipino actor, dancer, singer, and social media personality. He is known for his dance covers with his half-sister Niana Guerrero.

Career
Ongsee started as a member of boyband Chicser in 2010. He joined YouTube in 2008, but uploaded his first video in August 2011. He had acting stints on TV5. In 2017, he gained fame in YouTube alongside Niana Guerrero for their dance covers.

Filmography

Television

Awards and nominations

References

External links
YouTube Channel
Instagram

1997 births
Living people
Filipino male dancers
21st-century Filipino male singers
Filipino YouTubers
People from Quezon City
TV5 (Philippine TV network) personalities